Gumine District is a district of the Simbu Province of Papua New Guinea.  Its capital is Gumine.  The population was 56,860 at the 2011 census.
Gumine District comprises the following major tribes and language groups:

1. Dom (Karamaril, Minuma, Gaima)
2. Era (Moremaule, Buli)
3. Mian (Gumine Station, Tagla)
4. Kia (Omkolai)
5. Golin (Boromil, Yani, Dirima, Bokolma, Mul)
6. Yuri (Dia, Gomgale, Waramond
7. Sa (Nondri, Amia)

References

Districts of Papua New Guinea
Chimbu Province